Buzz Dixon (December 7, 1953) is an American writer of comic books, film, and cartoons. He has written comics for multiple companies, including Eclipse Comics (where he wrote Destroyer Duck alongside Steve Gerber), Marvel Comics, and a Buck Rogers adaptation for TSR, Inc.

His cartoon work includes both writing and editing credits. He wrote numerous episodes of GI Joe: A Real American Hero, The Transformers, Thundarr the Barbarian, Jem, Inhumanoids, Alvin and the Chipmunks, Tiny Toon Adventures, Tarzan and the Super 7 (the Web Woman installments), Visionaries: Knights of the Magical Light, Dungeons & Dragons and Teen Wolf. He also served as a story editor for the GI Joe and Teen Wolf series, and was a story consultant on G.I. Joe: The Movie and My Little Pony: The Movie.

Screenwriting credits
 series head writer denoted in bold

Television
 Web Woman (1978)
 The Freedom Force (1978)
 The New Shmoo (1979)
 The Plastic Man Comedy/Adventure Show (1979-1980)
 Heathcliff (1980)
 Thundarr the Barbarian (1980-1981)
 Goldie Gold and Action Jack (1981)
 Alvin and the Chipmunks (1983)
 Dungeons & Dragons (1983)
 Mister T (1983)
 Mighty Orbots (1984)
 G.I. Joe: A Real American Hero (1985-1986): season 2 head writer
 The Transformers (1985-1986)
 Inhumanoids (1986)
 Teen Wolf (1986-1987)
 Bionic Six (1987)
 Spiral Zone (1987)
 Visionaries: Knights of the Magical Light (1987)
 BraveStarr (1988)
 Garbage Pail Kids (1988)
 Jem (1988)
 Superman (1988)
 Chip'n Dale: Rescue Rangers (1989)
 Teenage Mutant Ninja Turtles (1989)
 Tiny Toon Adventures (1990)
 Batman: The Animated Series (1992)
 Conan the Adventurer (1992)
 My Little Pony Tales (1992)
 Wild West C.O.W.-Boys of Moo Mesa (1993)
 Transformers: Generation 2 (1993)
 G.I. Joe Extreme (1995)

Film
 G.I. Joe: The Movie (1987)

References

External links

 Interview with Dixon, at ComicsReporter.com
 Marv Wolfman interviews Dixon
 Dixon comics bibliography
 
 Buzz Dixon's personal blog
 Snokie, Buzz Dixon's company blog
2001 interview with Dixon, at JoeHeadquarters (via archive.org)

Living people
1953 births
American comics writers